Sual Power Station is a 1,200-MW coal-fired power station located near Lingayen Gulf in Sual, Pangasinan, Philippines.

Ownership and administration
The coal-fired power station is owned by Team Energy, a company established as a joint venture between Marubeni Corporation and Tokyo Electric Power Corporation. San Miguel Energy Corporation is the independent power producer administrator (IPPA) of the facility since 2009.

Background
Development started when Consolidated Electric Power Asia Ltd, a subsidiary of Hopewell Holdings, bid and won a $900mn BOOT tender for a 1,000-MW power station at Sual. Site preparation began in 1995 and construction started in February 1996. It was made operational in 1999 and full power generation was commenced in 2007.

Due to the presence of the coal power plant, Sual port was established close to the power plant in 2012. Sual Port a large port for the cargo of coal, and among the largest and most important coal discharge ports of The Philippines. Sual port is located close to Sual power plant, and caters mainly to the thermal power plant. It can accommodate ships with a maximum draft of 13.3 metres and a maximum LOA (Length overall) of 225 metres.

See also
List of power stations in the Philippines
List of largest power stations in the world

References

Coal-fired power stations in the Philippines
Buildings and structures in Pangasinan